China National Highway 301 (G301) runs from Suifenhe, Heilongjiang to Manzhouli, Inner Mongolia. It is 1,680 kilometres in length and runs northwest from Suifenhe towards Manzhouli.

Route and distance

See also
 China National Highways
 AH6

External links
Official website of Ministry of Transport of PRC

301
Transport in Heilongjiang
Transport in Inner Mongolia